A by-election was held for the New South Wales Legislative Assembly electorate of Northern Tablelands on 23 May 1987. The by-election was triggered by the resignation due to ill health of sitting Labor party member, Bill McCarthy, who died 3 days later. McCathy's widow Thelma was the Labor candidate at the by-election.

Dates

Results

Labor party member, Bill McCarthy resigned due to ill health, dying 3 days later.

See also
Electoral results for the district of Northern Tablelands
List of New South Wales state by-elections

References 

1987 elections in Australia
New South Wales state by-elections
1980s in New South Wales